The Humboldt Mountains are a group of mountains immediately west of the Petermann Ranges, forming the westernmost portion of the Wohlthat Mountains in Queen Maud Land, Antarctica.

History
The mountains were discovered and mapped by the Third German Antarctic Expedition (1938–1939), led by Alfred Ritscher, who named them for Alexander von Humboldt, famed German naturalist and geographer of the first half of the nineteenth century.

Historic monument
A plaque was erected at India Point in the Humboldt Mountains in memory of three scientists of the Geological Survey of India, as well as a communications technician from the Indian Navy, all of whom were members of the ninth Indian Expedition to Antarctica, who died in an accident at the site on 8 January 1990. The plaque has been designated a Historic Site or Monument (HSM 78), following a proposal by India to the Antarctic Treaty Consultative Meeting.

Geological features

Mount Skarshovden 
Mount Skarshovden is a rounded mountain, 2,830 m, surmounting the western side of Hovdeskar Gap. It was discovered and photographed by the Third German Antarctic Expedition, 1938–39, mapped by Norway from air photos and surveys by Norwegian Antarctic Expedition, 1956–60, and named Skarshovden ("the gap mountain").

Yanovskiy Rocks 
First mapped from air photos and surveys by Soviet Antarctic Expedition, 1960–61, and named after Soviet hydrographer S.S. Yanovskiy.

References

 
Mountain ranges of Queen Maud Land
Princess Astrid Coast
Historic Sites and Monuments of Antarctica